The Caspian tern (Hydroprogne caspia) is a species of tern, with a subcosmopolitan but scattered distribution. Despite its extensive range, it is monotypic of its genus, and has no accepted subspecies. The genus name is from Ancient Greek hudros, "water", and Latin progne, "swallow". The specific caspia is from Latin and, like the English name, refers to the Caspian Sea.

Description
Adult birds have black legs, and a long thick red-orange bill with a small black tip. They have a white head with a black cap and white neck, belly, and tail. The upper wings and back are pale grey; the underwings are pale with dark primary feathers. In-flight, the tail is less forked than other terns, and wingtips are black on the underside. In winter, the black cap is still present (unlike many other terns), but with some white streaking on the forehead. The call is a loud heron-like croak.

Distribution and habitat
Their breeding habitat is large lakes and ocean coasts in North America (including the Great Lakes), and locally in Europe (mainly around the Baltic Sea and Black Sea), Asia, Africa, and Australasia (Australia and New Zealand). North American birds migrate to southern coasts, the West Indies and northernmost South America. European and Asian birds spend the non-breeding season in the Old World tropics. African and Australasian birds are resident or disperse over short distances.

In 2016, a nest of the Caspian tern was found in the Cape Krusenstern National Monument in northwestern Alaska, 1,000 miles further north than any previous sighting.  This development was part of a general trend in Alaska of species moving to the north, a tendency ascribed to global warming.

The global population is about 50,000 pairs; numbers in most regions are stable, but the Baltic Sea population (1400–1475 pairs in the early 1990s) is declining and of conservation concern.

The Caspian tern is one of the species to which the Agreement on the Conservation of African-Eurasian Migratory Waterbirds (AEWA) applies.

Behaviour

Feeding
They feed mainly on fish, which they dive for, hovering high over the water and then plunging. They also occasionally eat large insects, the young and eggs of other birds and rodents.

Breeding

Breeding is in spring and summer, with one to three pale blue-green eggs, with heavy brown spotting, being laid. They nest either together in colonies, or singly in mixed colonies of other tern and gull species. The nest is on the ground among gravel and sand, or sometimes on vegetation; incubation lasts for 26–28 days. The chicks are variable in plumage pattern, from pale creamy to darker grey-brown; this variation assists adults in recognizing their own chicks when returning to the colony from feeding trips. Fledging occurs after 35–45 days.

Gallery

References

External links 

 Caspian Tern species text in The Atlas of Southern African Birds
 
 
 
 
 
 
 
 

Caspian tern
 Birds of Central Asia
 Birds of Eurasia
 Birds of Madagascar
 Birds of North America
 Birds of the Dominican Republic
 Birds of Oceania
 Birds of West Africa
 Birds of Africa
Caspian tern
Cosmopolitan birds
Holarctic birds